George Dyer (born 22 October 1999) is a New Zealand rugby union player who plays for  in the National Provincial Championship. His playing position is prop.

Reference list

External links
itsrugby.co.uk profile

1999 births
New Zealand rugby union players
Living people
Rugby union props
Waikato rugby union players
Chiefs (rugby union) players